America the Beautiful is a 2007 American documentary film about self-image in the United States directed by Darryl Roberts. The film had a limited release on August 1, 2008.

External links
 
 
 Hollywood Reporter: Independent picks up 'America'
 Q&A with Darryl Roberts, filmmaker, about "America the Beautiful"
 'America the Beautiful': A Problem of Self-Image

2007 films
American documentary films
2007 documentary films
Body image in popular culture
2000s English-language films
2000s American films